Peter Browngardt is an American animator, storyboard artist, voice actor, writer and producer currently working as executive producer and creative director behind Looney Tunes Cartoons. He is perhaps best known for being the creator of Cartoon Network's Uncle Grandpa, in which he also voices the title character, a spin-off of the earlier Secret Mountain Fort Awesome. Browngardt has had prior experience working on shows such as Futurama, The Venture Bros., Chowder and The Marvelous Misadventures of Flapjack. His main contribution to the Adventure Time series is storyboarding and writing the episode "Wizard".

Browngardt was raised in Sag Harbor, New York, on Long Island. He graduated California Institute of the Arts. In 2021, Browngardt signed an overall deal with Warner Bros. Animation and Cartoon Network Studios which will allow him to develop and produce animated programming at both studios.

Filmography

References

External links
 
 

Living people
Animators from New York (state)
American cartoonists
American male voice actors
American storyboard artists
American television writers
American animated film producers
Television producers from New York (state)
American male television writers
Uncle Grandpa
California Institute of the Arts alumni
People from Sag Harbor, New York
Screenwriters from New York (state)
Cartoon Network Studios people
1979 births